Galore Galore is the sixth studio album by alternative rock band Sponge.

Track listing

Band members

 Vinnie Dombroski - vocals
 Billy Adams - drums
 Tim Krukowski - bass/back-up vocals
 Kyle Neely - guitar/back-up vocals
 Andy Patalan - guitar/back-up vocals

Additional personnel

 Mark Arminski - photography and cover art
 Tonya Juhl - cover model
 Mike Pigeon - Tour manager

Additional musicians

 John Dunn
 Chris Codish
 James Simonson
 Danielle Arsenault
 Marlon Young
 Jeff Folks
 Matt O'Brian
 Anamaria Ylizaliturri
 Bob Hecker

References 

Sponge (band) albums
2007 albums